The Laurence Olivier Award for Best Actress in a Supporting Role is an annual award presented by the Society of London Theatre in recognition of achievements in commercial London theatre. The Oliviers were established as the Society of West End Theatre Awards in 1976, and renamed in 1984 in honour of English actor and director Laurence Olivier.

This award was first given in 1977, then was replaced in 1985 by the commingled actor/actress Best Performance in a Supporting Role, which replaced the 1977 to 1984 pair of Best Actress in a Supporting Role and Best Actor in a Supporting Role awards. From 1991 to 2012, the general supporting category vacillated at random between the commingled singular award (presented for 12 different seasons) and the pair of awards (presented for the other 11 seasons); the commingled award was last given in 2012, and the split pair of Best Actor and Best Actress awards have been presented every year since.

Winners and nominees

1970s

1980s

1990s

2000s

2010s

2020s

See also

 Critics' Circle Theatre Award for Best Actress
 Evening Standard Theatre Award for Best Actress
 Tony Award for Best Featured Actress in a Play

References

External links
 

Actress
Theatre acting awards
Awards for actresses